Joyce J. Scott (born 1948) is an African-American artist, sculptor, quilter, performance artist, installation artist, print-maker, lecturer and educator. Named a MacArthur Fellow in 2016, and a Smithsonian Visionary Artist in 2019, Scott is best known for her figurative sculptures and jewelry using free form, off-loom beadweaving techniques, similar to a peyote stitch. Each piece is often constructed using thousands of glass seed beads or pony beads, and sometimes other found objects or materials such as glass, quilting and leather. In 2018, she was hailed for working in new medium — a mixture of soil, clay, straw, and cement — for a sculpture meant to disintegrate and return to the earth. Scott is influenced by a variety of diverse cultures, including Native American and African traditions, Mexican, Czech, and Russian beadwork, illustration and comic books, and pop culture.

Scott is renowned for her social commentary on issues such as racism, classism, sexism, violence, and cultural stereotypes, as well as themes of spiritual healing. Her work is about how Scott sees herself in a rapidly changing world: "These works are about personal growth, personal epiphanies and how not to get stuck in the easy ways of life- about art I am fairly fearless but in everyday life I am not."

Biography 
Joyce Jane Scott was born in Baltimore in 1948, the daughter of noted quilt maker Elizabeth Talford Scott and Charlie Scott Jr. She has described herself as "a true Baltimore babe and Sandtown girl" and has lived in a row house in the Sandtown neighborhood for more than four decades. Her mother encouraged her creativity and Scott began drawing at the Coppin Demonstration School, a public education institution, and later attended Lemmel Middle School and Eastern High School in Baltimore. She graduated with Bachelor of Fine Arts from the Maryland Institute College of Art in 1970, and then earned a Masters of Fine Arts from the Instituto Allende in Mexico. Later, Scott pursued further education at Rochester Institute of Technology in New York and Haystack Mountain School of Crafts in Maine.

Scott's own mother was an artist who taught Scott appliqué quilting techniques and encouraged her to pursue her career as an artist. One of her earliest artistic endeavors was sewing doll clothes. Scott is also influenced by craft traditions in her extended family of "quilters, woodworkers, basketweavers, chair caners, planters and blacksmiths," where people developed skills in more than one craft so that they could survive. Her love of music and deep sense of spirituality solidified in her upbringing in the Pentecostal faith with its rich tradition in gospel music.

Scott's African influences are manifested in her use of intricate and elaborate decoration. By using techniques similar to West African Yoruba beadwork crowns and regalia, she reconfigures beads into a sculptural format. According to scholar Leslie King-Hammond, African arts and tradition functioned to transform every day objects into beautiful decorations.

Scott's practice includes performance in addition to sculpture. Her unapologetically critical and humorous personality is often employed in her performances to critique issues such as feminism, sexism, and racism. Like her jewelry and quilt works, her performance also often addresses storytelling and memory.

Scott's works are held by the Baltimore Museum of Art, Detroit Institute of Arts, Mildred Lane Kemper Art Museum in St. Louis, Missouri, the Mint Museum of Art in Charlotte, North Carolina, the Spencer Museum of Art at the University of Kansas, the Smithsonian American Art Museum, and the Museum of Fine Arts, Houston, Texas. Her works, Yellow #4 and Birth of Mammy #4, were acquired by the Smithsonian American Art Museum as part of the Renwick Gallery's 50th Anniversary Campaign.

Featured exhibitions

I-con-nobody/I-con-o-graphy
Held at the Corcoran Gallery of Art in 1991, this was Scott's first major solo exhibition. "The title implied the telling of truths, both the straightforward and symbolic kinds. Iconography, the symbols that explain images, and, concomitantly, society, were used by Scott to reveal the hidden motivations behind human interactions." On exhibition were 29 beaded sculptural works and several large fiber-and-fabric wall collages. Included were selections (partly inspired by her mother's stories and work as a nanny) from Scott's Mammy/Nanny series (1986-1991) in which she used glass beads and leather to create racial and value distinctions.

Believe I've Been Sanctified
This was Scott's first work of public art. In 1991, she was chosen along with nineteen other artists to participate in a new citywide project organized by the Spoleto Festival USA in Charleston. The exhibition was called "Places with a Past: New Site-Specific Art in Charleston" and each artist was invited to select an outdoor site and create a piece that conveyed their sense of the city's community history. Scott chose four Corinthian columns that were the last remaining remnants of the old Charleston Museum. She was told by the people at the African American historical society that "they never wanted us in there anyway" and was inspired. Using found objects and beading, Scott turned the columns into weeping willows to represent tears. Beneath them she constructed a funeral pyre from 500 logs and a figure dying, or a Phoenix, to represent "the end of slavery or the beginning of a new era, Reconstruction."

Images Concealed
In 1995 Scott responded to the Yale University for the Museum of African Art exhibition Face of the Gods: Art and Altar of Africa and African Americans with an installation titled Images Concealed at the San Francisco Art Institute. Curator Jean-Edith Weiffenbach noted that Scott, "challenged by that exhibition's revelations of the impact of African traditions on Western art, belief systems, and social customs [...] fashioned a reply that uses a contemporary hybrid of craft vocabularies from several cultures in an allegorical language that confronts stereotypes as well as issues of representation and perception."

Kickin' it With the Old Masters
Kickin' It with the Old Masters was an art exhibition held at the Baltimore Museum of Art (BMA) in January–May 2000 in collaboration with Maryland Institute College of Art (MICA). "At the entrance to the exhibition space sat Rodin's Thinker, an icon of Western art; above the statue's head Scott suspended a beaded figure hung by the neck by chains and covered with racial epithets." The juxtaposition was not to incite racial accusations but to establish an interaction with aesthetics and social constructs.

Harriet Tubman and Other Truths
Her largest exhibition to date opened October 20, 2017, and was on view through April 1, 2018 at Grounds for Sculpture. The exhibit, an homage to Harriet Tubman, the abolitionist who led many enslaved people to freedom, was ere organized with guest curator Lowery Stokes Sims for the exhibit, which was seen as a catalyst for transforming the public space created by J. Seward Johnson, the sculptor and philanthropist.  This exhibition was guest curated by both Lowery Stokes Sims and Patterson Sims.

Public art installations

Memorial Pool 

Scott received a commission in 1996 to create a public art project commemorating Pool No. 2 in Baltimore's Druid Hill Park. Built in 1921, it served the recreational and competitive swimming needs of over 100,000 African Americans in Baltimore. When the Baltimore City Parks Board refused to desegregate its pools despite a highly publicized drowning in a nearby river in 1953, the NAACP filed a lawsuit and eventually won on appeal. In June 1956 Baltimore pools opened as desegregated facilities for the first time. Pool No. 2 closed the next year, remaining largely abandoned until 1999 when Scott's installation transformed it.

In designing this functional monument, Scott intended to create an “art situation where people can go into space and hopefully be, and have a variety of uses.” The pool area itself was filled with soil and planted with grass. There were plans to include programming in the grassy area, that people would want to sit, picnic or just relax around the space. In addition to the architectural framing devices and aquatic symbolism, the original installation included abstract, colorful painted designs on the pavement around the pool that have since faded from the concrete surface and disappeared due to time and weather.

Exhibitions 
Scott's exhibits include:
2020 Visibilities: Intrepid Women of Artpace, Artpace, San Antonio, TX. Curator: Erin K. Murphy
2018  Joyce J. Scott: Harriet Tubman and Other Truths, Grounds for Sculpture, Hamilton, N.J. Curators: Lowery Stokes Sims and Patterson Sims
2016  Generations: Joyce J. Scott | Sonya Clark, Goya Contemporary Gallery, Baltimore, MD. Curator: Amy Eva Raehse
 2016  Joyce J. Scott, Fuller Craft Museum, Brockton, MA. Curator: Bruce Hoffman
 2015  Joyce J. Scott: Truths & Visions, Sarah Moody Gallery, University of Alabama, Tuscaloosa AL(catalog). Curator: Patterson Sims
 2015  Joyce J. Scott: Truths and Visions, Museum of Contemporary Art, Cleveland, OH(Catalogue). Curator: Patterson Sims
 2014  Can’t We All Just Get Along?, Goya Contemporary, Baltimore MD (Catalogue). Curator: Amy Eva Raehse
 2014  Maryland to Murano: Neckpieces and Sculptures by Joyce J. Scott, Museum of Arts and Design, New York, NY (catalogue). Curator: Lowery Stokes Sims
 2012  On Kilter, Goya Contemporary, Baltimore, MD (Catalogue). Curator: Amy Eva Raehse
 2012  Joyce J. Scott: A Solo Exhibition of Prints, Film and Performance, The Creative Alliance, Baltimore, MD
 2010-2011   Li’l Lies and Purty Thangs, Goya Contemporary, Baltimore, MD (Catalogue).  Curator: Amy Eva Raehse
 2010  McColl Center for Visual Art, Charlotte, NC
 2010  The Wine Dark Sea, The Mitchell Gallery at St. John's College, Annapolis, MD (Catalogue)
 2010  Love Letters, Mobilia, Cambridge MA
 2008  Joyce J. Scott: PAINFUL DEATH/PAINLESS LIFE, Goya Contemporary, Baltimore, MD (Catalogue) Curator: Amy Eva Raehse
 2008  Joyce J. Scott in Tampa, Scarfone/Hartley Gallery, Tampa University, Tampa, FL
 2007  Kickin’ It with Joyce J. Scott, Houston Center for Contemporary Art, Houston, TX. Curator: George Ciscle/ Exhibits USA
 2007  Kickin’ It with Joyce J. Scott, Polk Art Museum, Lakeland, FL. Curator George Ciscle/ Exhibits USA
 2007  Joyce J. Scott: Breathe, Goya Contemporary, Baltimore, MD (Catalogue) Curator: Amy Eva Raehse
 2005  Joyce J. Scott, Dirtwork, C. Grimaldis Gallery, Baltimore, MD. 
 2005  This Hand Washes That Hand Too, Mesa Contemporary Arts at the Mesa Art Center, Mesa, AZ.
 2004  Kickin' It with Joyce J. Scott, California African American Museum, Los Angeles, CA. Curator George Ciscle/ Exhibits USA
 2004  Joyce J. Scott, Snyderman Gallery, Philadelphia, PA
 2004  Joyce J. Scott, Walter Gropius Artist, Huntington Museum of Art, Huntington, WV
 2004  Still Alive in 2004, Ward Center for the Arts, St. Paul Schools, Brooklandville, MD
 2003  Joyce J. Scott, Untethered, George Mason University, Fairfax, VA
 2003  What a Long, Strange, Bumpy Trip it’s Been!, Sculpture & Monoprints by Joyce J. Scott, Center of Contemporary Arts (COCA), St. Louis, MO
 2001  Joyce J. Scott, In Search of Self-Unfathomable, Susan Cummins Gallery, Mill Valley, CA
 2001  Joyce J. Scott, WTC Series, Goya Contemporary, Baltimore, MD
 2000  Joyce J. Scott, Kickin' it With The Old Masters, Baltimore Museum of Art Baltimore, MD (catalogue). Curator: George Ciscle and the students at the Maryland Institute College of Art (MICA)
 2000  Life After Fifty, Noel Gallery, Charlotte, NC
 2000  Treacherous Tickles:  Recent Sculpture & Prints, Main Gallery, University of Texas, El Paso, TX
 2000  Joyce J. Scott, Sybaris Gallery, Royal Oak, MI
 1999   Incognegroism, Richard Anderson Gallery, New York, NY
 1999  Joyce J. Scott, A Muse, American Craft Museum, New York, NY
 1999  Joyce J. Scott, The Radiance of What Is, Contemporary Art Center of  Virginia, Virginia Beach, VA
 1999  Joyce J. Scott: New Lithographs and Monoprints, Goya Contemporary, Baltimore, MD
 1998  Things That Go Bump in the Night II, Gallery 181, Iowa State University, Ames, IA
 1996  Joyce Scott, Mixed Bag, Leedy Voulkos Gallery, Kansas City, MO
 1995  Images Concealed, San Francisco Art Institute, San Francisco, CA (catalogue)
 1995  Joyce J. Scott, The Hand and the Spirit, Scottsdale, AZ
 1994  Hard Choices, Laumeier Sculpture Park, St. Louis, MO (catalogue)
 1992  Joyce J. Scott, Brooklyn College of Art Gallery, Brooklyn, NY (traveling, catalogue)
 1992  Dimensional Objects and Jewelry, Politics of the Body, Esther Saks Fine Art, Ltd, Chicago, Illinois[10]
 1991  I-con-no-body / I-con-o-graphy, Corcoran Gallery of Art, Washington, DC (catalogue)
1991  Believe I've Been Sanctified, "Places with a Past: New Site-Specific Art in Charleston," Spoleto Festival USA in Charleston, South Carolina
 1988  Thru the Veil-, Textile Center for the Arts, Chicago, Illinois[10]
 1985  Dreamweaver, The Cultural Center, Chicago Public Library, Illinois[10]
 1981  Something Got a Hold on Me, Washington Project for the Arts, Washington, DC[10]
 1981  Something Got a Hold on Me, Washington Project for the Arts, Washington, DC

Select honors and awards 
Below are a few selected awards, honors and fellowships Scott has received so far in her career:
 Gold Medalist, American Craft Council (2020)
 Smithsonian Visionary Artist (2019) 
 MacArthur Fellow, John D. and Catherine T. MacArthur Foundation, Chicago, IL (2016)
 Masters of the Medium, James Renwick Alliance, Smithsonian American Art Museum, Smithsonian Institution, Washington, DC (2006)
 Governor's Arts Award at Artsalute: Maryland Citizens for the Arts Foundation, Walters Art Museum, Baltimore, MD (2002)
 Fellow, American Craft Council, New York, NY (2001)
 National Living Treasure Award, Maryland Nominee (1996)
 Mid Atlantic Arts Foundation Award (1994)
 Pace Roberts Fellowship (1994)
 National Printing Fellowship (1992)
 Mid Atlantic Consortium Award (1990)
 Maryland State Arts Council Fellowship (1987, 1981)
 Fellowship, National Endowment of the Arts (1980)

Museum collections
 Voices, 1993. Museum of Arts and Design
 Lovers, 2002. Museum of Arts and Design
 Water Mammy 1, 2012. Museum of Arts and Design
 Three Graces Oblivious While Los Angeles Burns, 1992. The Corning Museum of Glass
 Baltimore Museum of Art, Baltimore, Maryland 
Rodney King's Head Was Squashed Like a Watermelon, 1991. Philadelphia Museum of Art, Philadelphia, Pennsylvania 
Flaming Skeleton #3, 1993. Detroit Institute of Arts, Detroit, Michigan 
The Sneak, 1989. The Museum of Fine Arts, Houston, Texas 
Sixteen Days in His Life, 1997-99. Mildred Lane Kemper Art Museum, St. Louis, Missouri 
Joyce J. Scott. Mint Museum, Charlotte, North Carolina 
Necklace, 1994.
Africa, ca. 1980. Smithsonian American Art Museum, Washington D.C. 
Caffeine, 1994-99. Spencer Museum of Art, The University of Kansas, Lawrence, Kansas 
Beaded Necklace. Racine Art Museum, Racine, Wisconsin 
American Craft Museum, New York, NY
Brooklyn Museum of Art, Brooklyn, NY 
Charles A. Waustum Museum, Madison, WI
Philbrook Museum of Art, Tulsa, OK
Renwick Gallery, Smithsonian Institution, Washington, DC
Rhode Island School of Design Museum, Providence, RI
Ronald Reagan Washington National Airport, Washington, DC
Sheppard & Enoch Pratt Foundation, Towson, MD
Speed Museum, Louisville, KY
Weatherspoon Art Gallery, Greensboro, NC
None Are Free until All Are Free, 2006. Yale University, New Haven, CT

References

Further reading

Stankard, Paul J. "Burning Embers." Glass Quarterly, no. 136 (Autumn 2014): 26-34.

Sims, Lowery S, Joyce Scott, Patterson Sims, and Seph Rodney. Joyce J. Scott: Harriet Tubman and Other Truths. , 2018.

External links

Joyce J. Scott: Harriet Tubman and Other Truths, Grounds for Sculpture video. October 27, 2017.
Oral history interview with Joyce J. Scott, 2009 July 22, from The Nanette L. Laitman Documentation Project for Craft and Decorative Arts in America, Archives of American Art. 
Craft in America, Joyce J. Scott PBS Documentary
Art Alliance for Contemporary Glass, Joyce J. Scott, Artist of the Month July 2010 - 
Art Alliance for Contemporary Glass, Joyce J. Scott, Short Resume 
Interview with Curtia James, from Sources: Multicultural Influences on Contemporary African American Sculptors, February 2 - April 11, 1994, The Art Gallery at the University of Maryland at College Park
Joyce J. Scott Kickin' It with the Old Masters exhibition, Prints, Drawings and Photographs Department Records finding aid, Archives and Manuscripts Collections, The Baltimore Museum of Art
Joyce J. Scott: Painful Death / Painless Life, November 15, 2008 - January 23, 2009, Goya Contemporary - Goya Girl Press, Baltimore, MD
Joyce J. Scott: Images Concealed, February 9 - March 19, 1995, San Francisco Art Institute
Breathe: Joyce J. Scott, February 23 - April 20, 2007, Goya Contemporary - Goya Girl Press, Baltimore, MD
On Kilter: Joyce J. Scott, September 12 - November 10, 2012, Goya Contemporary - Goya Girl Press, Baltimore, MD
Talking Shop: Craft + Defiance November 17, 2015 at Baltimore School for the Arts, The Contemporary, Baltimore, MD
A woman artist speaks / Joyce J. Scott ; interviewed by Naomi Eftis and Elaine Heffernan, broadcast ca. July 27, 1977 on WPFW, Washington, D.C.

1958 births
Living people
American contemporary artists
Quilters
American glass artists
Women glass artists
Maryland Institute College of Art alumni
Instituto Allende alumni
Artists from Baltimore
20th-century American artists
20th-century American women artists
21st-century American artists
21st-century American women artists
MacArthur Fellows
Fellows of the American Craft Council
20th-century African-American women
20th-century African-American people
20th-century African-American artists
21st-century African-American women
21st-century African-American artists